The 1966 Colgate Red Raiders football team was an American football team that represented Colgate University as an independent during the 1966 NCAA University Division football season. Head coach Hal Lahar returned for a fifth consecutive season, his 10th overall. The team compiled a 8–1–1 record. Raymond Ilg was the team captain. 

In its first home game of 1966, Colgate renamed its Hamilton, New York, football field — previously known as Colgate Athletic Field — as Andy Kerr Stadium, honoring Andrew Kerr, the Red Raiders' coach from 1929 to 1946.

Schedule

Leading players 
Statistical leaders for the 1966 Red Raiders included: 
 Rushing: Marvin Hubbard, 893 yards and 13 touchdowns on 191 attempts
 Passing: Ronald Burton, 733 yards, 49 completions and 4 touchdowns on 118 attempts
 Receiving: Douglas Hale, 340 yards on 21 receptions
 Total offense: Ronald Burton, 1,537 yards (733 passing, 804 rushing)
 Scoring: Marvin Hubbard, 88 points from 13 touchdowns, 3 PATs, 2 two-point conversions and 1 field goal
 All-purpose yards: Marvin Hubbard, 1,069 yards (893 rushing, 170 kickoff returning, 6 receiving)

References

Colgate
Colgate Raiders football seasons
Colgate Red Raiders football